Kurt Egger (born 19 January 1956) is a Swiss politician of the green party. He is a member of the Swiss National Council.

Early life 
Egger grew up in Wittenbach and went to the high school on Frauenfeld, after which he studied mechanical engineering at ETH Zürich. Since 1996 he is the director of an energy and environmental consulting company Nova Energie GmbH in Sirnach. He is married and lives in Eschlikon.

Politics 
From 2012 until 2020, he was a member of the Grand Council of Thurgau, the cantonal legislature. He is president of the local chapter of the green party in Eschlikon and, since 2015, is the president of the cantonal green party. He was voted to represent the green party in the national assembly in the fall elections of 2019.

References

External links 

 
 Website of Kurt Egger

Living people
1956 births
21st-century Swiss politicians
Members of the National Council (Switzerland)
People from Thurgau